Qurd ol Duran-e Kord (also Romanized as Qūrd ol Dūran-e Kord; also known as Kūrt Kandī and Qūrd ol Dūran) is a village in Yowla Galdi Rural District, in the Central District of Showt County, West Azerbaijan Province, Iran. At the 2006 census, its population was 265, in 47 families.

References 

Populated places in Showt County